Patricia Agnes Glassop (6 July 1926 – 21 September 2010), also professionally known as Patricia Hutchence was an Australian film and television makeup artist, and was the mother of INXS frontman Michael Hutchence. In later years she was an author.

Biography
Patricia Agnes Kennedy was born on 6 July 1926. In her teens she became a model and carried on modeling up to her thirties. 
 She was married at age of eighteen. A year later, she had a daughter named Tina. She later divorced her first husband.

When she was thirty years old, she married her second husband Kelland Hutchence. On 22 January 1960 her first son Michael was born. Two years later her second son Rhett was born. The family moved to Hong Kong when son Michael was four years old and stayed there until he was twelve years old. In 1966 while still living in Hong Kong, both Patricia and her daughter Tina became involved in the film Strange Portrait that starred Jeffrey Hunter. Patricia had the makeup artist job and Tina had a small part in the film. Fellow Australian Terry Bourke was involved with the production of the film. The film, however, never saw release. In 1970, she worked as makeup and hair stylist in the film Noon Sunday. It was her second time working with Bourke.

Her marriage to Hutchence lasted seventeen years. 
 
In 1991, at age 62, she married Ross Glassop, a retired pilot who was in the Royal Australian Air Force.

She died at age of 84 on 21 September 2010.

She had three children Tina, Michael and Rhett Hutchence and was survived by Tina and Rhett.

Author

As Patricia Glassop
 Caring for the family's future : a practical guide to identification and management of perinatal anxiety and depression by Bryanne Barnett, Cathrine Fowler, Patricia Glossop -  Chipping Norton, N.S.W. : Surrey Beatty & Sons Pty Ltd, c2004 
 Just a man : the real Michael Hutchence by Tina Hutchence and Patricia Glassop -  London : Sidgwick & Jackson, 2000

As Patricia Hutchence
 Make-up is magic by Patricia Hutchence  (paperback) - Crows Nest, N.S.W. : Little Hills Press, 1988 Hardcover title - Make-up is magic, For the 1920s to now, corrective, fantasy and fun

Makeup and hair stylist

References

External links
 

Australian make-up artists
Australian non-fiction writers
1926 births
2010 deaths